
The James E. Walker Library is the campus library of Middle Tennessee State University (MTSU). Opened in 1999 under university president James E. Walker, it replaced an older library in Todd Hall, now home to the Art Department. A four-story,  building, the MTSU library contains over 1 million volumes and more than 33,000 periodicals.

Construction on the James E. Walker Library started on the 85th anniversary of the university's founding, September 11, 1996. The old Todd Library, which had been expanded to a capacity of 225,000, held almost three times that many when the new library opened.

Library departments
The James E. Walker Library houses offerings in 24 distinct departments, including:

Gallery

References

External links

Middle Tennessee State University
University and college academic libraries in the United States
Libraries in Tennessee
Buildings and structures in Murfreesboro, Tennessee
Library buildings completed in 1999
1999 establishments in Tennessee